William Leckie (born 25 August 1928) is a British rower. He competed in the men's coxed four event at the 1948 Summer Olympics.

References

1928 births
Living people
British male rowers
Olympic rowers of Great Britain
Rowers at the 1948 Summer Olympics
Place of birth missing (living people)